Thomas William Francis Gann (13 May 1867 – 24 February 1938) was a medical doctor by profession, but is best remembered for his work as an amateur archaeologist exploring ruins of the Maya civilization.

Personal history

Thomas Gann was born in Murrisk Abbey, County Mayo, Ireland, the son of William Gann of Whitstable, England, and Rose Garvey of Murrisk Abbey. He was raised in Whitstable, where his parents were prominent in the social life of the town. Gann trained in medicine in Middlesex, England.

Somerset Maugham named the heroine of Cakes and Ale Rosie Gann.

Career
In 1894 he was appointed district medical officer for British Honduras, where he would spend most of the next quarter century. He soon developed a keen interest in the colony's Mayan ruins, which up to then had been little documented. He also traveled in the Yucatán Peninsula, exploring ruins there.

Gann discovered a number of sites, including Lubaantun, Ichpaatun and Tzibanche. He published the first detailed descriptions of such ruins as Xunantunich and Lamanai. He made important early exploration at Santa Rita, Louisville, and Coba. At Tulum he documented buildings overlooked by previous explorers, including a rare find of a temple with the Pre-Columbian idol still intact inside.

Midway through his career, in 1908 Gann became the honorary lecturer in Central American Antiquities at the new Institute of Archaeology of the University of Liverpool (not long after he had taken the Diploma there in Tropical Medicine).  Liverpool subscribers funded several of his fieldwork seasons up to 1912.

Retirement

Thomas Gann retired as British Honduras's medical officer in 1923 when he wrote several books about his travels and explorations. He sold a large number of objects he had collected in the Mayan region to the British Museum in 1924.

Works
 The Maya Indians of Southern Yucatan and Northern British Honduras (Washington: Government Printing Office, 1918)
 with Thompson, J.E. The History of the Maya (London: Scribner, 1931) 
 Mexico from the Earliest Times to the Conquest (London: Lovat Dickson, 1936)

Notes

References

External links
 

1867 births
1938 deaths
People from County Mayo
19th-century Irish people
19th-century explorers
20th-century explorers
Irish archaeologists
Irish explorers
19th-century travel writers
20th-century travel writers
Irish travel writers
Belizean academics
Explorers of Central America
Mayanists
Irish Mesoamericanists
19th-century Mesoamericanists
20th-century Mesoamericanists
Mesoamerican archaeologists